Kidwelly is a town in Carmarthenshire, Wales.

Kidwelly may also refer to:

Places
 Kidwelly Castle, a Norman castle in Kidwelly, Wales
 Kidwelly Priory, a former Benedictine priory in Kidwelly, Wales

Institutions
 Kidwelly RFC, a rugby club representing Kidwelly, Wales
 Kidwelly Industrial Museum, a museum about the Kidwelly tinplate industry
 Kidwelly Town Council, the town council of Mynydd-y-Garreg, Wales and Kidwelly, Wales

People
 Maurice de Londres (died 1166), Lord of Kidwelly
 Isabella de Beauchamp (c. 1263–1306), Lady of Kidwelly
 Patrick de Chaworth (died 1283), Lord of Kidwelly and wife of Isabella de Beauchamp

Transportation
 Kidwelly railway station, a railroad station in Kidwelly, Wales
 Kidwelly and Llanelly Canal, a former canal system in Carmarthenshire, Wales
 Kidwelly Flats Halt railway station, a former British military railroad station in Pembrey, Wales

Other
 Kidwelly sex cult, a former cult in Kidwelly, Wales

See also
 Kidwell (disambiguation)